Gordon Young is a Scottish football manager who was assistant manager of Hartlepool United.

Career

Young started his managerial career as youth manager of Scottish top flight side Motherwell. In 2010, he was appointed manager of Motherwell. In 2013, he was appointed youth manager of Sheffield United in the English third division. In 2016, Young was appointed manager of Scottish top flight club Dundee United. After that, he was appointed assistant manager of  East Fife in the Scottish third division.

In 2017, he was appointed manager of American youth team Impact Soccer Club. In 2018, Young was appointed assistant manager of Falkirk in the Scottish second division. After that, he was appointed assistant manager of Latvia. After that, he was appointed manager of Latvian outfit Liepāja. In 2019, Young was appointed assistant manager of Cove Rangers in the Scottish fourth division.

References

External links
 

Scottish football managers
Living people
Expatriate football managers in Latvia
Expatriate football managers in England
Year of birth missing (living people)
Hartlepool United F.C. non-playing staff